Tatiana Shamanova (born 18 January 1992) is a Russian former professional racing cyclist. For three consecutive years, Shamanova finished in the top ten overall of the Tour of Adygeya – seventh in 2013, third in 2014 and fifth in 2015.

See also
 List of 2016 UCI Women's Teams and riders

References

External links
 
 

1992 births
Living people
Russian female cyclists
Place of birth missing (living people)